Spišská Nová Ves District is a district in the Košice Region of eastern Slovakia. 
The district in its present borders was established in 1996. Administrative, economic and cultural center is its seat Spišská Nová Ves. The district borders Gelnica District and Rožňava District in the south and Poprad District, Prešov District and Levoča District in the north.

Municipalities

Arnutovce
Betlanovce
Bystrany
Danišovce
Harichovce
Hincovce
Hnilčík
Hnilec
Hrabušice
Chrasť nad Hornádom
Iliašovce
Jamník
Kaľava
Kolinovce
Krompachy
Letanovce
Lieskovany
Markušovce
Matejovce
Mlynky
Odorín
Olcnava
Oľšavka
Poráč
Rudňany
Slatvina
Slovinky
Smižany
Spišsska Nová Ves (head)
Spišské Tomášovce
Spišské Vlachy
Spišský Hrušov
Teplička
Vítkovce
Vojkovce
Žehra

References

External links
Detailed district information 

 
Geography of Košice Region
Districts of Slovakia